Ochrota nyassa is a moth of the subfamily Arctiinae. It was described by Strand in 1912. It is found in Malawi.

References

Endemic fauna of Malawi
Lithosiini
Moths described in 1912